Cadjan are woven mats made from coconut palm leaves, used for roofing and walls. Cadjan houses were available in many Asian countries in past, but with development these houses are now limited to very rural areas in India, Sri Lanka and a few other Asian countries.

Building materials
Coconuts